André Cochinal (born 1905, date of death unknown) was a French diver. He competed in the men's 10 metre platform event at the 1924 Summer Olympics.

References

External links
 

1905 births
Year of death missing
French male divers
Olympic divers of France
Divers at the 1924 Summer Olympics
Place of birth missing